Neutral point clamped (NPC) inverters are widely used topology of multilevel inverters in high-power applications. This kind of inverters are able to be used for up to  several megawatts applications. See links for more information.

See also
 Active power filter
 Synchronverter

References

Power electronics